McCool is a surname.

McCool, MacCool, or variation, may also refer to:

Places
McCool, Mississippi, USA; a town in Attala County
McCool Junction, Nebraska, USA; a village in York County
McCool, Ontario, Canada; an unincorporated community in Timiskaming District, Northeastern Ontario
McCool (crater), a crater on the Moon

Other uses
  (aka USS McCool), a U.S.Navy San Antonio-class amphibious transport dock ship 
 McCool Stadium, Cleveland, Mississippi, USA; an American football field
 McCool Junction Public Schools, York County, Nebraska, USA; a school board
 McCool Junction Elementary School, McCool Junction Public Schools, York County, Nebraska, USA

See also

MCOOL (mandatory country of origin labeling)
One Night at McCool's, 2001 film
Cool McCool, 1966 animated TV show
 Cool (disambiguation)